Chetman Singh Bhandari, better known as Manu Brajaki (1942-2018) was a Nepalese writer. He wrote multiple short stories and gazal in his lifetime. He was known for his use of regional themes and elements in his works.

Biography 
Brajaki was born as Chetman Singh Bhandari in a Chhetri zamindar family on 3 August 1942 (19 Shrawan 1999 BS) in Aurahi, Mahottari district. He published his first story in 1962 in Anchal Sandesh, a Janakpur based magazine .

Awards 
He won the prestigious Sajha Puraskar for his short story collection Timri Swasni ra Ma in 2046 BS. He was awarded with Padmashree Sahitya Puraskar for his short story collection Annapurnako Bhoj for the year 2070 BS. He also received the Jagadish Ghimire Smriti Puraskar in 2074 BS. 

In 2017, he was awarded the Pahalman Singh Swar Lifetime Literary Award.

Notable works 
Short story collections
 Avamulyan
Aakashko Phal
Timri Swasni ra Ma
 Bhabishya Yatra
Paradarshi Manchhe
Manu Brajakika Laghu Katha
Annapurnako Bhoj (Annapurna's Feast)
Gazal collections

 Gazal Ganga
 Kandaka Phoolharu
 K hereko Ye Jindagi!

Personal life 
He died on 2 February 2018 (19 Magh 2074 BS) due to brain haemorrhage. He is survived by his wife, a son and a daughter.

References

Further reading 

 

1942 births
2018 deaths
People from Mahottari District
20th-century Nepalese male writers
21st-century Nepalese male writers
Nepali-language writers
Sajha Puraskar winners
Nepalese short story writers
Padmashree Sahitya Puraskar winners